The Memorial Bridge, locally known as the toll bridge, crosses the Ohio River connecting Belpre, Ohio and Parkersburg, West Virginia. The bridge is an alternate route to access U.S. Route 50 in Ohio from central Parkersburg.

While some internal WVDOT documents refer to the bridge as West Virginia Route 140, the number is not signed nor shown on state-issued maps.

The bridge was completed , and is of a steel through truss design, a combination of two camelback-Warren through trusses, and a 3-span cantilevered Warren through truss.  It accommodates two lanes of traffic, one in either direction.

This bridge has a toll for passenger cars of $0.50; travelers may also purchase tickets to reduce the toll from $0.50 to $0.40 per trip when $2.00 worth are purchased.  There are no automatic lanes and E-ZPass is not accepted.

As of August 18, 2022, the bridge has been closed to all traffic indefinitely while a project to make improvements to the bridge is underway. Previously the bridge was reduced to one way traffic, but many vehicles were violating this by going around barriers which prompted the bridge partners to close it for safety of workers.

See also
List of crossings of the Ohio River

References

External links
Memorial Bridge at Bridges & Tunnels

Bridges over the Ohio River
Bridges completed in 1954
Toll bridges in West Virginia
Toll bridges in Ohio
Bridges in Appalachian Ohio
Monuments and memorials in West Virginia
Monuments and memorials in Ohio
Buildings and structures in Parkersburg, West Virginia
Transportation in Wood County, West Virginia
Road bridges in Ohio
Road bridges in West Virginia
Steel bridges in the United States
Cantilever bridges in the United States
Warren truss bridges in the United States
Belpre, Ohio